"Ain't No Half-Steppin'" is a 1988 hip-hop song written and performed by American rapper Big Daddy Kane. Released as a single from Kane's debut album Long Live the Kane, it peaked at No. 53 on the Billboard Hot Black Singles chart. The song samples "Ain't No Half Steppin'" by Heatwave, "UFO" by ESG, and "Blind Alley" by The Emotions.

In 2012, Rolling Stone ranked "Ain't No Half-Steppin'" No. 25 on its list of The 50 Greatest Hip-Hop Songs of All Time.

Charts

Weekly charts

References

Big Daddy Kane songs
1988 singles
1988 songs
Songs written by Big Daddy Kane
Cold Chillin' Records singles
Song recordings produced by Marley Marl